Rouxville is a suburb of Johannesburg, South Africa, around  northeast of City Hall.

It was founded in 1896 on part of the farm known as Klipfontein, and its name comes from the Jacobus Petrus Roux (1865–1929), who sold the land to F.D.J. Viljoen in 1895. Like much of northeastern Johannesburg, it was predominantly English-speaking.

Sources 
 Raper, Peter Edmund (2004). New Dictionary of South African Place Names. Johannesburg/Cape Town: Jonathan Ball Publishers.
 Stals, Prof. Dr. E.L.P (ed.) (1978). Afrikaners in die Goudstad, vol. 1: 1886 - 1924. Cape Town/Pretoria: HAUM.

References 

Suburbs of Johannesburg